The physical attractiveness stereotype is a tendency to assume that people who are physically attractive also possess other desirable personality traits. Stereotyping is the process by which people draw inferences about others based on knowledge of the categories to which they belong. 

Physical attractiveness can have a significant effect on how people are judged in terms of employment or social opportunities, friendship, sexual behavior, and marriage. In many cases, humans attribute positive characteristics, such as intelligence and honesty, to attractive people without consciously realizing it. Physically attractive individuals are regarded more positively and accurately in first impressions. Additionally, the physical attractiveness stereotype will bias an observer's opinions and decisions when comparing people of different attractiveness levels.

In some instances, physical attractiveness is distinct from sexual attraction; humans may regard the young as attractive for various reasons, for example, but without sexual attraction.

History 
The physical attractiveness stereotype was first formally observed in a study done by Karen Dion, Ellen Berscheid, and Elaine Walster in 1972. Study participants, all students, were told by the experimenters that they would be tested on how well they could "read" a person after seeing a single photo of them, and that their performance would be compared to individuals that had been trained to be able to read a person based on body language and other interpersonal skills. The subjects were then given three envelopes that contained a photo of either a male or female near the subjects' age, who the researchers had categorized as either attractive, average, or unattractive. The experimenters asked the subjects a series of questions related to personality which were given mathematical value to calculate attractiveness' correlation to actual traits in the experiment. The students were also asked questions about the personal lives of the individuals in the photos, such as whether they thought the individual had a happy marriage. The students told the experimenter how successful the individual in the photo was. Dion, Berscheld, and Walster found that those who were deemed more attractive scored higher in regards to most traits, apart from if they would make good parents. 

In the years since the publication of this study, further research has bolstered the physical attractiveness stereotype. In 1991, a meta-analysis of several other studies into the physical attractiveness stereotype found strong evidence supporting the existence of the phenomenon.  In a study done in 2011, researchers attempted to determine if attractiveness had an effect on an individual’s ability to memorize or remember information. The researchers used a sample group of university students as well as the three scales of attractiveness as seen in the original study. Participants were shown images with positive and negative words written on them, then later were asked to recall which words had been written on which faces. The students had to click through the gallery of faces with a mouse, and were given no time limit to decrease the likelihood of another variable affecting the results of the experiment. The results showed that the students were more likely to remember positive words that were linked to an individual who was attractive, and negative words when they were paired with an unattractive photo.

Researchers found that even minor changes to appearance could evoke a different response or lead to more judgment. This was seen in a study where the shade of a photographed individual's teeth were slightly altered to see if it would cause study participants to alter their impressions of them. When researchers lightened the photographed subject's teeth, participants attributed more positive qualities to those individuals. When they were darkened or made more yellow, more negative qualities were attributed to them.

Children 
Studies show that teachers perceive attractive children as more intellectual, more engaged in school, and more likely to succeed academically than unattractive children. This may be because teachers have been shown to have more positive interactions with attractive children. In addition, other studies show that customers' perceptions of the quality of service are boosted by physical attractiveness.

In a recent study done in 2013  by Iris Vermeir and Dieneke Van De Sompel they aimed to see if physical attractiveness stereotypes can also be seen in children. The study also wanted to know if this affected the way that the children ages 8-13 would purchase products based on advertisements. The subject or participants were separated into two different age groups, 8-9 and 12-13. This was due to the fact that these two age groups have extremely different reasoning levels due to their development. The results demonstrated that children 8-9 years of age are affected more likely to make assumptions, while 12 to 13 year olds were less likely to, mainly concerning an individual’s intelligence.

Beauty premium phenomenon 
Studies show that a better physical appearance contributes to the belief of a person being more intelligent, successful, important, and valuable:

 The scores of those physically attractive are higher than less physically attractive people on measures of affect  and mood.
 People tend to perceive attractive people as smarter, more successful, more sociable, more dominant, mentally healthier and higher in self-esteem than physically unattractive people.
 Physically attractive people are more sociable and less socially anxious and lonely than less physically attractive people.
 Physically attractive people are more popular than less attractive people and people are more likely to have an interaction with people who are physically attractive. 
 Individuals are more likely to give personal information to physically attractive people than less physically attractive people. 
 Physically attractive students tend to receive better grades. 
 A physically attractive person is more likely to be reinforced than a less attractive person.
 Physically unattractive people with psychological disturbances are judged to be more maladjusted and to have a poorer prognosis than physically attractive people with the same psychological disturbance. 
 A physically attractive person is more likely to be found less guilty than a less attractive person while they are charged with the same crime. 
 Physically unattractive defendants are considered to be more dangerous than physically attractive offenders in sex-related crimes.
 Physically attractive individuals found guilty of a particular crime are more likely to receive more generous sentences than less physically attractive defendants. 
 People pay more attention to physically attractive strangers than to unattractive strangers of either sex. For example, people avoided sitting next to people with physical deformities. 
 People with facial disfigurements and other flaws are seen as less desirable. Even babies seem to prefer physically attractive faces to physically unattractive ones.

Disadvantages
Reactions to beauty may lead to interpersonal tension and conflict. For example, people may attribute greater negative and egocentric traits to them due to envy. Extremely attractive individuals may be refused by their own sex type who are envious of them. Attractive people are often confused with whether people are attracted to their appearance or their inner qualities. They are also more likely to rely on their looks than on their other attributes. A review of literature  illustrates that attractive males experience much greater social and economic advantages than attractive females.  Attractive females commonly face a hostile work environment with female supervisors and female coworkers - unless the attractive female is employed in a low-status position.  Initially, both males and females (of average attractiveness) suspect attractive females of being intellectually inferior, but not so of attractive males. Attractive females are placed in a social position in which they must demonstrate above-average competence.  Attractive males are not challenged in this manner.

See also

 List of cognitive biases

Notes

References

Cognitive biases
Interpersonal attraction

Stereotypes

de:Attraktivitätsforschung#Wie wirkt sich Attraktivität im sozialen Kontext aus?